Sri Piyaratana Tissa Mahanayake Thero (12 December 1826 - 20 May 1907), also known as Dodanduwa Piyaratne Thero, was the Mahanayaka Thero of the Amarapura Nikaya (circa 1860s), and the Sanganayake of the Southern Province. He popularised the 'Poruwa' ceremony at Buddhist weddings.

He established Sri Lanka's first Buddhist school in 1869, Jinalabdhi Vishodaka, now known as Dodanduwa Piyarathana Vidyalaya. He is believed to be the founding father of Buddhist education in Sri Lanka.

He was a member of the Weerasooriya family of Dodanduwa and Hikkaduwa, he was the brother of David Weerasooriya and uncle of Arnolis Weerasooriya.

The Tibetan Monk S. Mahinda was ordained by him. He was also a close friend of Henry Steel Olcott and administered 'pansil' to him.

Early life and works
Piyaratana Tissa Mahanayake Thero was the son of Don Margiris de Silva Weerasooriya. He was the chief monk (Viharadhipathy) at the Gothami Viharaya (Borella), Shaila Bimbaramaya Temple in Dodanduwa , and Mangalaramaya (Beruwela). He established the first Buddhist School in Sri Lanka, Jinalabdhi Vishodaka, located within the premises of Sailabimbaramaya Temple in Dodanduwa. He managed to do this despite the difficulties faced from colonial leaders at the time.

In 1883, he was appointed Head of the Sri Kalyanawansa Chapter. He also formed a Buddhist Society, Lokaratha Sadhana Sangamaya, which became a forefront of safeguarding Buddhist education in the country.

Founding of Jinalabdhi Vishodaka (Dodanduwa Piyarathana Vidyalaya)
In 1869, Piyaratana founded Jinalabdhi Vishodaka, the first Buddhist School in Sri Lanka. It was initially located inside the Sri Swarna Shaila Bimbaramaya Temple in Dodanduwa.

Originally known as Jinalabdhi Vishodaka ("in the love of Buddha"), it was subsequently re-named by Siridhamma Thero; his pupil, successor and the chief incumbent of the Temple, following Piyaratana's death.

Olcott contributed in many ways towards this school, financially and in resources, including laboratory equipment. This included a 8-mm projector with film rolls, which is believed to be the first projector brought to Sri Lanka.

Correspondences with Colonel Olcott
Piyaratana exchanged correspondence with Colonel Henry Steel Olcott several years before Olcott arrived in Sri Lanka.

In 1880, Colonel Olcott and Madame Helena Blavatsky arrived at the Galle Harbour, and travelled to the Sailabimbaramaya Temple in Dodanduwa, where they met Piyaratana, to learn about the difficulties faced by Buddhists and their education. 'Pansil' was first administered to Olcott by Piyaratana.

Olcott wrote in his diary 

Letters sent by Olcott to Piyarathana can be found in the Library of Sailabimbaramaya Temple. As a result of Piyarathana's efforts, he was conferred an honorary membership of the Theosophical Society, which was based in New York. In 1878 the official document, Akthapatra, certifying his membership, was sent to Piyarathana, signed by Henry Steele Olcott, Helena Blavatsky and Alexander Wilder. It provides the following description,

Due to their combined efforts, the first Buddhist school was officially registered in 1874, five years after its formation. According to the documents available in the Sailabimbaramaya Temple, Olcott and Blavatsky spent ten days in the temple discussing the revival of Buddhist education. Besides Jinalabdhi Vishodaka, Piyarathana also established several other Buddhist Schools, including Upadya Kanishta Vidyalaya at Panadura, the Weligama Buddhist School and similar Buddhist schools in Kathaluwa and Ahangama.

Letter between Olcott and Ven Piyaratana
Letter to Dodanduwa Sri Piyaratana Tissa Mahanayake Thero, by Henry Steel Olcott:

Death and legacy
Piyaratana died on 20 May 1907, aged 80. Following his death his disciple, Ven. Dodanduwe Dammissara Thera, became the administrator of the school and founded an English school in the Sailabimbarama Temple premises.

The Postal Ministry issued a postal stamp valued at 60 cents on 22 May 1984 commemorating Piyaratana.

See also
 Sri Lankan Buddhism

References

1826 births
Sri Lankan Buddhist monks
1907 deaths
People from Galle
Theravada Buddhist monks
Sri Lankan Theravada Buddhists
20th-century Buddhist monks
19th-century Buddhist monks
Sinhalese monks